Notopleura is a genus of flowering plants in the family Rubiaceae, native to Central America, the Caribbean, and northern South America. They tend to be subshrubs, herbs and epiphytes.

Species
Currently accepted species include:

Notopleura acuta C.M.Taylor
Notopleura aequatoriana C.M.Taylor
Notopleura aggregata (Standl.) C.M.Taylor
Notopleura agostinii (Steyerm.) C.M.Taylor
Notopleura albens C.M.Taylor
Notopleura aligera (Steyerm.) C.M.Taylor
Notopleura amicitiae C.M.Taylor
Notopleura aneurophylla (Standl.) C.M.Taylor
Notopleura aneurophylloides (Steyerm.) C.M.Taylor
Notopleura angustissima (Standl.) C.M.Taylor
Notopleura anomothyrsa (K.Schum. & Donn.Sm.) C.M.Taylor
Notopleura araguensis (Steyerm.) C.M.Taylor
Notopleura bahiensis C.M.Taylor
Notopleura biloba C.M.Taylor
Notopleura bryophila C.M.Taylor
Notopleura callejasii C.M.Taylor
Notopleura camponutans (Dwyer & M.V.Hayden) C.M.Taylor
Notopleura capacifolia (Dwyer) C.M.Taylor
Notopleura capitata C.M.Taylor
Notopleura chapensis (Steyerm.) C.M.Taylor
Notopleura cincinalis C.M.Taylor
Notopleura cocleensis C.M.Taylor
Notopleura congesta C.M.Taylor
Notopleura corniculata C.M.Taylor
Notopleura corymbosa C.M.Taylor
Notopleura costaricensis C.M.Taylor
Notopleura crassa (Benth.) C.M.Taylor
Notopleura cundinamarcana C.M.Taylor
Notopleura decurrens (Steyerm.) C.M.Taylor
Notopleura discolor (Griseb.) C.M.Taylor
Notopleura dukei (Dwyer) C.M.Taylor
Notopleura epiphytica (K.Krause) C.M.Taylor
Notopleura episcandens C.M.Taylor & Lorence
Notopleura fernandezii (Steyerm.) C.M.Taylor
Notopleura hondurensis C.M.Taylor
Notopleura humensis (Steyerm.) C.M.Taylor
Notopleura hurtadoi C.M.Taylor
Notopleura hypolaevis C.M.Taylor
Notopleura iridescens C.M.Taylor
Notopleura lanosa C.M.Taylor
Notopleura lateralis (Steyerm.) C.M.Taylor
Notopleura lateriflora (Standl.) C.M.Taylor
Notopleura latistipula (Standl.) C.M.Taylor
Notopleura leucantha (K.Krause) C.M.Taylor
Notopleura longiflora C.M.Taylor
Notopleura longipedunculoides (C.M.Taylor) C.M.Taylor
Notopleura longissima Bremek.
Notopleura macrophylla (Ruiz & Pav.) C.M.Taylor
Notopleura macropodantha (Standl.) C.M.Taylor
Notopleura madida (Standl.) C.M.Taylor
Notopleura marginata (Benth.) Bullock
Notopleura maxonii (Standl.) C.M.Taylor
Notopleura merumensis (Steyerm.) C.M.Taylor
Notopleura micayensis (Standl.) Bremek.
Notopleura microbracteata (Steyerm.) C.M.Taylor
Notopleura montana C.M.Taylor
Notopleura multinervia C.M.Taylor
Notopleura multiramosa (Steyerm.) C.M.Taylor
Notopleura nepokroeffiae C.M.Taylor
Notopleura obtusa C.M.Taylor
Notopleura pacorana C.M.Taylor
Notopleura palestinae (Standl. ex Steyerm.) C.M.Taylor
Notopleura panamensis (Dwyer) C.M.Taylor
Notopleura parasiggersiana C.M.Taylor
Notopleura parasitica (Sw.) Hammel
Notopleura parvifolia C.M.Taylor
Notopleura patria (Standl. & Steyerm.) C.M.Taylor
Notopleura penduliflora C.M.Taylor
Notopleura peperomiae (Standl.) C.M.Taylor
Notopleura perpapillifera (Steyerm.) C.M.Taylor
Notopleura perparva (Dwyer) C.M.Taylor
Notopleura pilosula C.M.Taylor
Notopleura pithecobia (Standl.) C.M.Taylor
Notopleura plagiantha (Standl.) C.M.Taylor
Notopleura polyphlebia (Donn.Sm.) C.M.Taylor
Notopleura pyramidata C.M.Taylor
Notopleura recondita Hammel & C.M.Taylor
Notopleura sallydavidsoniae R.Flores & C.M.Taylor
Notopleura sanblasensis C.M.Taylor
Notopleura saulensis (Steyerm.) C.M.Taylor
Notopleura scarlatina C.M.Taylor
Notopleura siggersiana (Standl.) C.M.Taylor
Notopleura spiciformis C.M.Taylor
Notopleura standleyana (Steyerm.) C.M.Taylor
Notopleura steyermarkiana C.M.Taylor
Notopleura subimbricata (Steyerm.) C.M.Taylor
Notopleura submarginalis C.M.Taylor
Notopleura sucrensis (Steyerm.) C.M.Taylor
Notopleura tapajozensis (Standl.) Bremek.
Notopleura terepaimensis (Steyerm.) C.M.Taylor
Notopleura thesceloantha (Steyerm.) C.M.Taylor
Notopleura tolimensis (Wernham) C.M.Taylor
Notopleura tonduzii (Standl.) C.M.Taylor
Notopleura torrana C.M.Taylor
Notopleura triaxillaris C.M.Taylor
Notopleura tubulistipula C.M.Taylor
Notopleura uberta (Standl. & Steyerm.) C.M.Taylor
Notopleura uliginosa (Sw.) Bremek.
Notopleura vargasiana C.M.Taylor
Notopleura wilburiana (Dwyer) C.M.Taylor
Notopleura zarucchiana C.M.Taylor

References

Palicoureeae
Rubiaceae genera